Fletcher Hills is a neighborhood in El Cajon and La Mesa, California.

Geography
Fletcher Hills is located in the northeastern part of La Mesa and El Cajon.

Demographics

The racial makeup of Fletcher Hills was 57,798 (58.4%) White, 5,207 (5.2%) African American, 724 (0.7%) Native American, 2,435 (2.4%) Asian (1.2% Filipino, 0.4% Chinese, 0.3% Vietnamese, and 0.5% other) and 386 (0.4%) Pacific Islander. Hispanic or Latino of any race were 27,024 persons (27.3%).

References

Census-designated places in San Diego County, California
Census-designated places in California